Colin Lewis (11 June 1882 – December 1962) was a British swimmer. He competed in the men's 100 metre backstroke event at the 1908 Summer Olympics.

References

1882 births
1962 deaths
British male swimmers
Olympic swimmers of Great Britain
Swimmers at the 1908 Summer Olympics
People from Chalford
British male backstroke swimmers